The siege of Colonia del Sacramento was a successful siege in 1704 by Spanish forces of the Portuguese colonial town of Colonia del Sacramento, opposite Buenos Aires and now in the nation of Uruguay.  Four thousand natives and 650 Spaniards, led by the governor of Buenos Aires, Don Alonso Juan de Valdes e Inclán, and Baltasar García Ros, besieged the city beginning late in 1704.  One week after a frontal assault failed, in early February 1705, the Portuguese abandoned Colonia del Sacramento.

References

Military history of Uruguay

Sieges involving Spain
Sieges involving Portugal
Battles of the War of the Spanish Succession
Conflicts in 1704
Conflicts in 1705
1700s in South America
1704 in South America
1705 in South America
Sieges of the War of the Spanish Succession